is a freemium action video game in the Pokémon series developed by Ambrella, published by The Pokémon Company and distributed by Nintendo for the Nintendo 3DS. It is the fourth game in the Pokémon Rumble subseries, and features toy versions of at least 719 creatures from the first six generations. The game was first released worldwide as a free-to-start download title on the Nintendo eShop on April 8, 2015, with physical retail versions available in Japan the following November, Europe in January 2016, and North America in April 2016.

Gameplay

Pokémon Rumble World is an action game with a top-down perspective that has players assume the role of their Mii character in the Kingdom of Toys, a land populated by toy versions of 719 distinct Pokémon species. At the behest of the King, the player must travel to various lands battling and collecting new Pokémon to increase their Adventure Rank, granting them access to new items and areas. By taking direct control of their Pokémon, they can engage other creatures in real-time combat.

The game uses a form of currency called Poké Diamonds, which can be obtained either through normal gameplay, purchased directly with real money through the Nintendo eShop, or exchanged through StreetPass. A limit on real-world currency use in-game does exist, however, and players are allowed to purchase a maximum of 3,000 Poké Diamonds through this method. After buying 3,000 of these, a mine will appear, granting 40 of them once per day. Poké Diamonds can be used to unlock features such as increasing the chance to find certain Pokémon, in-game travel, continuing to play a stage after a Pokémon's health has run out, or additional Pokémon storage. Challenges, which are missions with a specific set of goals, may also grant Poké Diamonds, in addition to cosmetic items such as clothing.

Development
The first mention of Pokémon Rumble World appeared in the game's entry on the Australian Classification Board content rating website in March 2015. It was officially announced two weeks later by Nintendo on an April 1, 2015 edition of their Nintendo Direct broadcast, along with a worldwide release date set for the following week on the Nintendo eShop. On October 2, 2015, Nintendo revealed that the title would receive a physical retail release in Japan the following month, with Nintendo of Europe later issuing a press release stating that an English retail version would also be arriving in Europe in January 2016. Retail versions of Rumble World remove support for in-game purchases, and instead grant the player access to all content from the start.

Reception

Pokémon Rumble World earned a 32 out of 40 total score from Japanese Famitsu magazine, based on individual reviews of 8, 8, 8, and 8. The game received mixed scores from critics, earning a 58 out of 100 from Metacritic. Destructoid felt that the game's freemium pay model was a step up from Pokémon Shuffle, calling it "Not bad, actually", and that it would allow players to earn in-game currency through normal gameplay without being hindered by timers or required payments. However, the title was criticized for being too simplistic, calling it "fairly shallow but very fun in spurts", and that was too short and lacked replay value. Metro similarly felt that the free-to-play system was "relatively fair", but that the overall game was "appallingly simplistic" and panned the title's "cheap production values" and "poor use of the pokémon mythos."

The Japanese retail version, released seven months after its Nintendo eShop debut, sold 10,120 copies in the region during its first week, debuting at number 16 on the Media Create sales charts. By December 2015 it had sold a total of 21,479 copies before falling from the top 20 sales rankings.

References

External links

2015 video games
Action role-playing video games
Ambrella games
Free-to-play video games
Video game sequels
Nintendo 3DS games
Nintendo 3DS eShop games
Nintendo 3DS-only games
Nintendo Network games
Sentient toys in fiction
Video games developed in Japan
Pokémon Rumble